Paolo Gerolamo Brusco or Girolamo Brusco (8 June 1742 – 30 March 1820)  was a prolific Italian painter active in Liguria.
He was also nicknamed Bruschetto.

Biography
Born in Savona, his father and one of his brothers were employed in painting local maiolica. Another brother, Giacomo, was a civil engineer. As a young man, he traveled to Rome and was influenced by the Neoclassic style of Anton Raphael Mengs, and may have trained with Pompeo Batoni

Works 

   St Vincent of Paoli in the first chapel to right of the Church of Sant'Andrea Apostolo (Savona).
   Stuccowork and frescoes for the Church of San Pietro (Savona).
   Mysteries of the Rosary: Canvases for the Church of San Bernardo of Italy.
   Frescoes in the presbytery for the Church of San Lorenzo of Cairo Montenotte.
   Fresco (1810) of St. Martin for the Church of San Martino of Italy.
   Frescoes for the Church of Santissima Trinità in Sassello.
   Frescoes for the Church of San Michele in Celle Ligure.
   Canvases and frescoes for the Church of San Nicolò in Albisola Superiore.
   Canvases for the Church of San Giovanni Battista of Savona.
   Frescoes for the Sanctuary of Nostra Signora delle Grazie al Molo in Genoa.
   Madonna di Misericordia  for the Oratory of Nostra Signora di Castello in Savona.

Sources 

Treccani Enciclopedia Dizionario biografico.

1742 births
1820 deaths
People from Savona
18th-century Italian painters
Italian male painters
19th-century Italian painters
19th-century Italian male artists
18th-century Italian male artists